Baft (also romanized as Bāft) is a city and capital of Baft County, Kerman Province, Iran. At the 2006 census, its population was 35,008, in 8,265 families.

Khabr National Park

Baft is one of the natural area in Iran. Within its local is the Khabr National Park which has been submitted by Iran as a UNESCO world heritage site. Khabr National Park has a rich flora (about 750 species) and about 120 endemic species.

References

Populated places in Baft County
Cities in Kerman Province